The 2008 TAC Cup season was the 17th season of the TAC Cup competition. Murray Bushrangers won their 2nd premiership title after defeating the Dandenong Stingrays in the grand final by 81 points.

Ladder

Grand final

References 

NAB League
Nab League